Panagiotis Provatopoulos (born 1914) was a Greek swimmer and water polo player. He competed in the men's 4 × 200 metre freestyle relay at the 1936 Summer Olympics and the water polo tournament at the 1948 Summer Olympics. At club level, he played for Olympiacos.

References

External links
 

1914 births
Year of death missing
Greek male swimmers
Greek male water polo players
Olympic swimmers of Greece
Olympic water polo players of Greece
Swimmers at the 1936 Summer Olympics
Water polo players at the 1948 Summer Olympics
Olympiacos Water Polo Club players
Place of birth missing
20th-century Greek people